Transition to and from Hostilities is a 2004 report by the Defense Science Board, a committee of civilian experts appointed to advise the U.S. Department of Defense on scientific and technical matters. The report was the foundation for a subsequent Department of Defense Instruction that elevated Operations Other Than War (OOTW) to co-equal status with combat operations.

Overview
The report made two key recommendations. First, that the management discipline demonstrated by United States Armed Forces in combat operations should be extended to peacetime work, post-conflict stabilization and intelligence in pre- and post-conflict phases of defense activities. Second, that additional capacity was required within United States Department of Defense in order to deliver the stabilization, reconstruction and intelligence tasks required in pre- or post-stabilization phases of Defense operations.

References

United States Department of Defense